Richard Howard, 4th Earl of Effingham (21 February 1748 – 11 December 1816) was a British peer and a member of the House of Lords, styled Hon. Richard Howard until 1791.

Biography
On 21 November 1763, Howard was commissioned a sub-brigadier and cornet in the 1st Troop of Horse Guards, and a brigadier and lieutenant on 21 January 1765. He was a Member of Parliament (MP) for Steyning from 1784 to 1790. On 29 March 1784, he was appointed Secretary and Comptroller of the Household to Queen Charlotte.

Howard inherited the earldom in 1791 from his brother, Thomas Howard, 3rd Earl of Effingham. On 7 September 1803, he was appointed Colonel of the Sheffield Regiment of Volunteers, and became Treasurer to the Queen in 1814, dying in 1816. At his death, the Earldom of Effingham became extinct, while his distant cousin Kenneth succeeded him as Baron Howard of Effingham.

Notes

References

1748 births
1816 deaths
18th-century British Army personnel
19th-century British Army personnel
Richard Howard, 4th Earl of Effingham
British Life Guards officers
Earls in the Peerage of Great Britain
Members of the Parliament of Great Britain for English constituencies
British MPs 1784–1790
Earls of Effingham
Barons Howard of Effingham